Jean-Paul Gurevitch (born September 7, 1941) is a French essayist. He is mainly known for his studies on migration, Africa, Islamism and children's literature.

Selected works 
 Les Enfants et la poésie (1969)
 Clefs pour l'audiovisuel (1973)
 Maux croisés: suspense (2008)
 L'immigration, ça coûte ou ça rapporte? (2009)
 Les Africains de France (2009)
 Les migrations pour les nuls (2014)
 Les véritables enjeux des migrations (2017)
 La Méditerranée: Conquête, puissance, déclin (2018)
 La France en Afrique: 1520 - 2020 - Vérités et mensonges (2020)

References 

Living people
1941 births
20th-century French male writers
21st-century French male writers
French male essayists
20th-century French essayists
21st-century French essayists